Kuala Belait Football Club (abbrev: KB FC) is a football team based in Kuala Belait, Brunei.

History 
The KB FC club has created a winning record in the competition since the Belait District Football Association established the Belait District League in 2019. Since then, especially considering that the players are all under 35 years old, club's young players have maintained a strong spirit. Their coach, Kambri, claimed in an interview that all of the team's players had a great deal of potential for advancement and a strong desire to compete in the Brunei League. They successfully made its debut in the Belait District League thanks to the encouragement and support of the general public, particularly the Football Association of Brunei Darussalam (FABD). They are presently engaged in demanding training at the Mumong Sports Complex.

In order to take part in the Brunei League tournament for the first time, Kambri wants his team to look for the greatest opportunity and keep trying. He claims that the majority of the KB FC players come from other football clubs and have previous experience playing in matches at the national level. They qualified for Group A after a victory against KB Warriors with the score 3–2. They gained promotion to the 2020 Brunei Super League but it was later cancelled due to the COVID-19 pandemic. They also participated in the 2021 Brunei Super League which was also cut short due to the same predicament.

Current squad

Honours 

 Belait District League: 2019

See also 

 List of football clubs in Brunei

References

Association football clubs established in 2019
Football clubs in Brunei
Works association football teams